Bak Jega (1750–1805) was a scholar of school of Practical learning (Silhak) in the late Joseon Dynasty. He was a student of Bak Jiwon.

Background
Bak Jega was a famous Silhak scholar in the late Joseon Dynasty. He was a student of another famous Silhak scholar, Park Jiwon. Bak Jega was born in 1750 and died in 1815. Bak Jega went to Qing (also referred to as "Ching"), which was the name of China at that time, after becoming a student of Bak Jiwon. He learned about China’s modern culture, advanced techniques, and its economic system while there. After returning from Qing, Bak Jiwon worked in Jiphyeonjeon, a place where important scholars and scientists worked, during the time of King Jeongjo.

Legacy
Because the Joseon government supported ‘Yuhak', a neo-Confucianist conservative ideology, Bak Jega had an important role and his desire was to make Joseon rich in science and commerce.

He authored several books; the compilation is titled, Jeongyungyp. He wrote about making the commerce system stronger in Umyoungnomchogo and Gunyeonjib. At that time, it was quite shocking to believe in Silhak, whose ideas opposed Yuhak.

Bak Jega developed the way of agriculture, and he also enhanced some of the farming machinery to cultivate plants.

Bukhak theory 
He argued that using the cart to develop local commerce and at the same time develop strong ships to actively enter foreign trade in his book, <Bukhakui>. He called for improving the reality and proactively embracing the culture of the Qing Dynasty. He argued for the abolition of Joseon's status system, and considered commerce and industry important. He said, " If we actively take advantage of the natural environment of Joseon, which is surrounded by the sea on three sides, and develop it into maritime trade, the national power will become strong and the livelihood of the people will be stabilized."

Books
 Bukhagui (북학의 北學議) : 
 Jeongyujip (정유집 貞否集)
 Myeongnongchogo (명농초고 明農草稿)
 Hangaekgeonyeonjip (한객건연집 韓客巾衍集)
 Sigo (시고 詩稿)
 Muyedobotongji

References

Further reading
 Kim Haboush, JaHyun and Martina Deuchler (1999). Culture and the State in Late Chosŏn Korea.  Cambridge: Harvard University Press. ;  OCLC 40926015
 Lee, Peter H. (1993). Sourcebook of Korean Civilization, Vol.  1. New York: Columbia University Press. ; ; ;  OCLC 26353271
 Noh, Daehwan. "The Eclectic Development of Neo-Confucianism and Statecraft from the 18th to the 19th Century," Korea Journal. Winter 2003.

External links
 우린 아직 박제가를 모른다 조선일보 2010.02.23
 중상학파 (重商學派)
 1997년 08월의 문화인물:초정 박제가(楚亭 朴齊家)

1750 births
Neo-Confucian scholars
Korean educators
Joseon scholar-officials
Korean scholars
Korean Confucianists
18th-century Korean philosophers
1815 deaths
18th-century Korean poets